Heart is a 1987 American sports drama film directed by James Lemmo (in his directorial debut), from a screenplay by Lemmo and Randy Jurgensen, who also produced the film. It stars Brad Davis, Jesse Doran, Steve Buscemi, Frank Adu, Sam Gray, Billy Costello, and Frances Fisher.

Plot
A punch-drunk boxer is set up as an easy win for an up-and-coming young boxer in this melodrama. The highlight of the film is the performance of Steve Buscemi as the oily, mob-connected fight promoter Nicky. Eddie (Brad Davis) is the addle-brained boxer Nicky hangs out to dry for quick money.

Cast
 Brad Davis as Eddie
 Frances Fisher as Jeannie
 Steve Buscemi as Nicky
 Frank Adu as Buddy
 Jesse Doran as Diddy
 Sam Gray as Leo
 Billy Costello as Manuella
 Saoul Mamby as First Opponent
 Daniel O'Shea as Joey
 Joseph Dolphin as Ames
 F.L. Schmidlapp as Freddie
 Robert Mathias as Tino
 Lance Davis as Jerry
 Peter Carew as Matty
 Anthony Bishop as Mr. Arturo
 Lisa Ellex as Rosa
 Tony Lip as Max
 Lynn Weaver as Peach

External links
 

1987 films
1987 directorial debut films
1987 drama films
1987 independent films
1980s sports drama films
American boxing films
American independent films
American sports drama films
New World Pictures films
1980s English-language films
Films directed by James Lemmo
1980s American films